Kiyapadu is a hamlet in Rayagada Tahasil of Gumma Panchayat in the state of Odisha, India dominated by Dongaria Tribe. The village was in lime light when the local people opposed the establishment of the Alumina Refinery by RSB.

Geography
Kiyapadu is situated about 329 km from the district headquarters i.e. Rayagada.

Demography
Majority of the population at and nearby Kiyapadu are primitive tribal.  census available in the "Official website of census india"  the population of the village was 297, of which 144 were males and 153 were females as per Population Census 2011.

Tourist attractions
The village is surrounded by hillocks. The nearest place of tourist interest is Chatikona.

References

External links
 Official website of Rayagada district

Villages in Rayagada district